Peer Smed (1878 – November 17, 1943) was a Danish-American silversmith and metalworker, active in New York City.

Smed was born as Peer Schmidt in Copenhagen, where he trained with the royal silversmiths as a peer to Georg Jensen. In 1903 he immigrated to the United States, where he opened a gold chasing business on Maiden Lane in New York City. He remained in New York until 1907, then returned to Denmark, but in 1909 moved again to Brooklyn where he established his workshop at 176 Johnson Street. There he produced handcrafted silver and metalwork until late in his life when he moved to 30 Irving Place in New York City. His New York Times obituary described him "as a gold carver, a silversmith and as a designer of iron grilles," but he also worked in copper and bronze, and even ivory. In addition, he acted as an industrial designer for Tiffany & Co. and the International Silver Company. He also created the flatware and holloware for the Waldorf-Astoria Hotel in 1932, working with Frederick William Stark, and made the bronze doors designed by William Zorach for the entrance to the Schwarzenbach Buildings.
 
His work is collected in the Art Institute of Chicago, Brooklyn Museum of Art, Metropolitan Museum of Art, and Dallas Museum of Art.

References 
 "Bowl, 1941, Peer Smed", Metropolitan Museum of Art.
 "Smed", Chicago Silver.
 "PEER SMED; Silversmith Won Honors From Kings of Denmark, Sweden", New York Times obituary, November 20, 1943, page 13, see also November 19, 1943, page 19.

1878 births
1943 deaths
American silversmiths
Danish silversmiths
20th-century Danish metalsmiths
Danish emigrants to the United States
People from Brooklyn